Marysville Swedesburg Lutheran Church is a historic church in Marysville Township, Minnesota, United States, built in 1891.  It was listed on the National Register of Historic Places in 1979 for having local significance in the themes of architecture, exploration/settlement, and religion.  It was nominated as one of Wright County's finest examples of a brick Gothic Revival parish church and for its association with the area's Swedish immigrants.

The community got its start with the arrival of Swedish settlers in 1869.  On February 25, 1873, the parish was organized, and the following year they built a church of hewn logs.  The community constructed its present building starting in 1891, with donated brick on a donated lot, and it was finished in 1893.  The community worshipped in this building until 1950, when they voted to dissolve the congregation and merge with Zion Lutheran Church (formerly known as Carlslund Swedish Evangelical Lutheran Church) in Buffalo.  The community continued to worship in the Marysville church while a new church building was built in Buffalo.  In 1973 the community restored the Marysville church to celebrate the centennial of the building's founding.  The community continues to hold worship services on Monday evenings during June, July, and August.

See also
 List of Lutheran churches
 National Register of Historic Places listings in Wright County, Minnesota

References

External links
 Marysville Church

Buildings and structures in Wright County, Minnesota
Churches completed in 1891
Gothic Revival church buildings in Minnesota
Lutheran churches in Minnesota
Churches on the National Register of Historic Places in Minnesota
Swedish-American culture in Minnesota
National Register of Historic Places in Wright County, Minnesota